The Javan ferret-badger (Melogale orientalis) is a mustelid endemic to Java and Bali, Indonesia. It is listed as Least Concern on the IUCN Red List and occurs from at least  elevation in or close to forested areas.

Description
The head is small with a narrow, blunt snout, long whiskers and large eyes. The body is low-slung with brown silky fur tinged with red and in some lights looks tawny or greyish. The back of the head and throat are darker brown and there are white markings on the face, neck, throat, chest and abdomen.

Distribution and habitat
The Javan ferret-badger is endemic to the islands of Java and Bali in Indonesia. Its exact range is unknown, but it is present in hilly and mountainous areas and may also occur at lower altitudes. In western Java, it has been observed in Mount Halimun Salak National Park and in Gunung Gede Pangrango National Park.
Javan ferret badgers have been recorded in the wild in just 30 localities in the Province of Banten, West Java, Central Java, Yogyakarta, East Java and on Bali.

Behaviour and ecology
Like other ferret-badgers, the Javan ferret-badger is a fossorial animal that makes use of pre-existing burrows in the forest floor. It is mainly nocturnal, and small groups of adults and juveniles forage together. It is often found in dense undergrowth and it may be able to scramble about in trees and bushes. Its diet is mainly carnivorous and consists of small animals, birds, amphibians, eggs, carrion and invertebrates, and it also eats fruit. Data from litters offered for sale on online platforms suggests a peak in breeding from December to March 

In the Gunung Gede Pangrango National Park, Javan ferret-badgers seem fairly common and have been observed scavenging for food scraps after nightfall at picnic areas and turning over the leaf litter. They seemed undisturbed by the presence of humans and one young individual even fed on biscuits held out on an observer's hand.

Threats and conservation
Much of Java's primary forest has been fragmented and degraded. However, the Javan ferret-badger is thought to be at least partially adaptable to habitat changes, as it has been recorded in secondary forests and plantations.
Over a ten year period from 2011 to 2020, Javan ferret badgers were observed offered for sale in eleven wildlife markets on Java and Bali, and on several online platforms.

References

Melogale
Mammals of Indonesia
Mammals described in 1888
Taxonomy articles created by Polbot